Fresh is the fourth studio album by Teddybears STHLM. It was released in 2004 by Epic Records. In 2005 Fresh was re-released by Sony Records, dropping the last song "Alma" of the track listing.

The album has been released with two alternative covers: one depicting the band members with a white backdrop along with the band name and one with album title and band name with a black background.

Track listing
"Cobrastyle" (feat. Mad Cobra) - 2:59
"Different Sound" (feat. Malte Holmberg) - 3:25
"Little Stereo" (feat. Daddy Boastin') - 3:04
"Hey Boy" (feat. Swing Fly) - 3:41
"The Lord's 115th Dream" (feat. Lord of Lightning) - 3:20
"Check" - 5:11
"Lil' Red Rooster vs. The Robodog" (feat. ADL) - 3:16
"Magic Kraut" - 5:14
"Black Belt" - 4:38
"Teddybear Music" - 3:30
"Alma" - 4:48
 All songs written by Teddybears STHLM, except track 1 co-written with Ewart E. Brown & Fabian Torsson, track 3 with Desmond Ballantine & Bobby Dixon, track 4 with Swing-Fly, and track 7 with Adam Batiste.

Musicians

Teddybears STHLM
 Joakim Åhlund
 Klas Åhlund
 Patrik Arve

Additional musicians
 Erik Olsson - drums (tracks 1, 6 & 8), vibraphone (track 8)
 Sarah Dawn Finer - backing vocals (track 1)
 Desmond Foster - backing vocals (tracks 2 & 3)

References
[ Fresh] at Allmusic
Fresh at Last.fm

2005 albums
Teddybears (band) albums